Matt Proudfoot (born 30 January 1972)  is a South African born former Scottish international rugby union player who played for Glasgow Warriors and Edinburgh Rugby. He was an assistant coach with South Africa, finishing after the 2019 World Cup. In January 2020 he became forwards coach for the England Men's Rugby Team.

Rugby Union Career

Amateur career

Educated at Potchefstroom High School for Boys, Proudfoot turned out in the Vodacom Cup and later Currie Cup for the Leopards (rugby team) after which he moved to Scotland to play for Melrose.

Professional career

Proudfoot then represented Edinburgh Rugby. He won 3 international caps while with Edinburgh, before returning to South Africa.

Injury forced him into semi-retirement but he still played for the Leopards and the Blue Bulls. Glasgow Warriors coach Hugh Campbell persuaded him to return to full-time Scottish professional rugby.

In 2003 he returned to Scotland to play for Glasgow Warriors. He won 1 more international cap while with the Warriors.

International career

He qualified for Scotland through his Dumfries grandfather.

He made his debut for Scotland in 1998 in a match against Fiji. He was capped 4 times for the national team finishing with a cap against  Ireland in 2003.

Coaching career

Proudfoot coached the forwards at Western Province, Stormers and North-West University and Kobelco Steelers in Japan.

On 17 May 2016 it was announced that Proudfoot would be leaving Kobelco Steelers to become an assistant coach with the South Africa national rugby union team where he contributed to the Springboks winning the 2019 Rugby World Cup.

On 13 January 2020 it was announced that Proudfoot had joined the England Men's Rugby Team as forwards coach ahead of the 2020 Six Nations.

References

External links 
 Glasgow Warriors Profile

1972 births
Living people
Edinburgh Rugby players
Glasgow Warriors players
Melrose RFC players
Rugby union players from Klerksdorp
Scotland 'A' international rugby union players
Scotland international rugby union players
Scottish rugby union coaches
Scottish rugby union players
South African people of Scottish descent
White South African people